Thomas Nixon (25 May 1931 – November 2003) is an English former amateur footballer who played as a wing half in the Football League for Darlington. He was on the books of Newcastle United without playing for their first team.

Nixon came into the Darlington side at left half as one of several team changes for the visit to Halifax Town in the Third Division North on 1 December 1951. They lost 4–1, and that was his only senior appearance.

He was born in Backworth, Northumberland, in 1931 and died in North Tyneside in 2003 at the age of 72.

References

1931 births
2003 deaths
People from Backworth
Footballers from Tyne and Wear
English footballers
Association football wing halves
Newcastle United F.C. players
Darlington F.C. players
English Football League players